The waterskiing competitions at the 2019 Southeast Asian Games in the Philippines were held at Deca Wakeboard Park from 6 to 8 December 2019.

Schedule
All times are local time (UTC+08:00).

Results
Legend
LCQ — Last Chance Qualification
FRS — First Round Score
N/A — Already Qualified

Men's Wakeboard

Women's Wakeboard

Men's Wakeskate

Women's Wakeskate

References

External links
  

2019 Southeast Asian Games events
Waterskiing at the Southeast Asian Games
2019 in water skiing